Today Was a Good Day is the fifth studio album by English musician Lucy Spraggan, released on 3 May 2019 by Cooking Vinyl. It debuted and peaked at No. 12 on the UK Albums Chart.

Track listing

Charts

References

External links

Lucy Spraggan albums
2019 albums
Albums produced by Jon Maguire